Untitled (Pope) is a circa 1954 oil on canvas panel painting by the Irish born, English artist Francis Bacon, one in a series of many representations of popes he painted after Diego Velázquez's 1650 Portrait of Innocent X. Bacon was a harsh self-critic and destroyed a great many of his own paintings, many of which were created under the influence of drink. This work was long thought lost until it reemerged on the art market in 2016. It is closely related to Bacon's  masterpiece, the Study after Velázquez's Portrait of Pope Innocent X in the Des Moines Art Center, Iowa.

When asked why he was compelled to revisit Velázquez's Portrait so often, Bacon said that he had nothing against popes, but merely sought "an excuse to use these colours, and you can't give ordinary clothes that purple colour without getting into a sort of false fauve manner". Bacon was in the 1950s coming to terms with the death of a cold, disciplinarian father, his early, illicit sexual encounters, and a very destructive sadomasochistic approach to sex, all of which informed this series of masterpieces.

Commenting on the freedom with brushwork in this example, Bacon biographer Michael Peppiatt said that Bacon was a gambler by nature and habit, and would often return to paintings late at night, to attack them with a brush to see what would happen. If he disliked the results he would simply have them destroyed. A number of people around Bacon were aware of these traits, and instead hid away the paintings, which have been reemerging since the mid-1990s.

References

Sources

 Peppiatt, Michael. Anatomy of an Enigma. London: Westview Press, 1996. 

1954 paintings
Paintings by Francis Bacon
Portraits of popes